Lincoln Land Community College is a public community college in Springfield, Illinois. It has extended branches in different locations, including Beardstown, Jacksonville, Litchfield and Taylorville, Illinois. The main campus is less than half a mile from the University of Illinois Springfield.

Athletics
The Lincoln Land Loggers are composed of 7 athletic teams representing Lincoln Land Community College in intercollegiate athletics, including baseball, men's and women's basketball, women's soccer, softball, women's volleyball, and Esports. The Loggers compete in the National Junior College Athletic Association.

The Loggers baseball team plays at Claude Kracik Baseball Field, the basketball teams and volleyball team play at Cass Gymnasium, the soccer team plays at the Lincoln Land Soccer Field, the softball team plays at the Lincoln Land Softball Field, and the Esports team plays in the Esports Arena.

National Championships 
Lincoln Land has won two NJCAA national titles.
 Baseball (1): 1994, 2000

Notable alumni
 Justin Allgaier, NASCAR driver for JR Motorsports
 Richard G. Austin, politician and former Adjutant General of the State of Illinois
 Kathleen Vinehout, Wisconsin State Senator
 Tim Wilkerson, NHRA Funny Car driver

 Nick Maton, Professional Baseball Player

References

External links
Official website
Official athletics website

 
Educational institutions established in 1968
1968 establishments in Illinois
Springfield, Illinois
Jacksonville, Illinois